Colorado's 7th congressional district is a congressional district in the U.S. state of Colorado. Formerly located only in the northeast part of the state, the district now encompasses the western parts of the Denver metropolitan area, including Golden, Lakewood, Arvada and Broomfield, along with the central Colorado counties of Jefferson, Park, Teller, Lake, Chaffee, Fremont, and Custer. 

The district has been represented by Democrat Brittany Pettersen since 2023.

History

2000s
The 7th congressional district was created following the 2000 U.S. Census and associated realignment and reapportionment of Colorado congressional districts. It formerly consisted of portions of Adams, Arapahoe, and Jefferson counties, see above for the more recent list. The boundaries were drawn by a court after the state legislature failed to agree on a redistricting plan.

Characteristics
As originally drawn, the 7th was a "fair fight" district that was split roughly 50-50 between Democrats and Republicans. The seat's original congressman, Republican Bob Beauprez, gave up the seat in 2006 to run for governor, and was succeeded by Democrat Ed Perlmutter. Since then, a growing Democratic trend in the Denver suburbs allowed Perlmutter to strengthen his hold on the seat.

Redistricting after the 2010 census shifted the district to the more populated portions of Jefferson County, making it slightly more Democratic.
The 2020 census has changed the district significantly, absorbing the rural areas in the central portion of the state.
Demographic details of the new district have not been added here as of 6/1/2022, but are likely to favor a more balanced "fair fight" as opposed to the Democratic trend of the prior boundary.

Voting
Election results from presidential races

List of members representing the district

Election results

2002

2004

2006

2008

2010

2012

2014

2016

2018

2020

2022

Historical district boundaries

See also

Colorado's congressional districts
List of United States congressional districts

References
 Congressional Biographical Directory of the United States 1774–present

7
Adams County, Colorado
Arapahoe County, Colorado
Jefferson County, Colorado
Constituencies established in 2003
2003 establishments in Colorado